Gangbuster is a 1977 crime film written and directed by Alberto Marras.

Cast 

 Ray Lovelock as Lawyer Mario Gastali  
 Mel Ferrer as Peseti, the Boss
 Lilli Carati asPaola
 John Steiner as Killer
 Gabriele Tinti as Tony

 Umberto Orsini as Farnese
 Orazio Orlando as Giorgio
  Rosario Borelli as Police Commissioner
  Romano Puppo as Peseti's henchman
 Gino Pagnani  as taxi driver

Production
Gangbuster was filmed at Elios Film in Rome. The film was producer Alberto Marras' only film made as a director.

Release
Gangbuster was distributed theatrically in Italy on 22 September 1977. When the film was released on home video in VHS in Italy it has an 88 minute and 29 second running time, and in Germany it had a 85 minute and 51 second running time, and was a different version of the film with inserts from Meet Him and Die. These included the car chases and prison fights from that film, and it featured a different sound score, such as Franco Micalizzi's theme from Merciless Man.

References
Notes

Bibliography

External links

1977 crime films
1977 films
Italian crime films
1970s Italian films